Jim Donald may refer to:

 Jim Donald (politician) (1895–1976), member of the Queensland Legislative Assembly
 Jim Donald (businessman), CEO of Starbucks
 Jim Donald (footballer), with Dumfries club Queen of the South
 Jim Donald (rugby union) (1898–1981), New Zealand rugby player

See also
 James Donald (disambiguation)